The Chess Olympiad is a biennial chess tournament in which teams representing nations of the world compete. FIDE organises the tournament and selects the host nation. Amidst the COVID-19 pandemic, FIDE held an Online Chess Olympiad in 2020 and 2021, with a rapid time control that affected players' online ratings.

The use of the name "Chess Olympiad" for FIDE's team championship is of historical origin and implies no connection with the Olympic Games.

Birth of the Olympiad
The first Olympiad was unofficial. For the 1924 Olympics an attempt was made to include chess in the Olympic Games but this failed because of problems with distinguishing between amateur and professional players. While the 1924 Summer Olympics was taking place in Paris, the 1st unofficial Chess Olympiad also took place in Paris. FIDE was formed on Sunday, July 20, 1924, the closing day of the 1st unofficial Chess Olympiad.
FIDE organised the first Official Olympiad in 1927 which took place in London. The Olympiads were occasionally held annually and at irregular intervals until World War II; since 1950 they have been held regularly every two years.

Drug testing
As a sporting federation recognized by the IOC, and particularly as a signatory to the World Anti-Doping Agency (WADA) conventions, FIDE adheres to their rules, including a requirement for doping tests, which they are obligated to take at the events such as the Olympiad. The tests were first introduced in 2002 under significant controversy, with the widespread belief that it was impossible to dope in chess. Research carried out by the Dutch chess federation failed to find a single performance-enhancing substance for chess. According to Dr Helmut Pfleger, who has been conducting experiments in the field for around twenty years, "Both mentally stimulating and mentally calming medication have too many negative side effects". Players such as Artur Yusupov, Jan Timman and Robert Hübner either refused to play for their national team or to participate in events such as the Chess Olympiad where drug tests were administered. All 802 tests administered at the 2002 Olympiad came back negative. However, in the 36th Chess Olympiad in 2004, two players refused to provide urine samples and had their scores cancelled. Four years later, Vassily Ivanchuk was not penalized for skipping a drug test at the 38th Chess Olympiad in 2008, with a procedural error being indicated instead.

In 2010, a FIDE official commented that due to the work of the FIDE Medical Commission, the tests were now considered routine. In November 2015, FIDE president Kirsan Ilyumzhinov announced they are working with WADA to define and identify doping in chess.

Competition
Each FIDE recognized chess association can enter a team into the Olympiad. Each team is made of up to five players, four regular players and one reserve (prior to the tournament in Dresden 2008 there were two reserves).

Initially each team played all other teams but as the event grew over the years this became impossible.  At first team seeding took place before the competition, with teams playing in preliminary groups and then finals. Later certain drawbacks were recognized with seeding and in 1976 a Swiss tournament system was adopted. Starting from 2008, the first criterion for determining ranking has been match points instead of board points. Teams score 2 points for a match win, 1 point for a drawn match and 0 points for a match loss.

The trophy for the winning team in the open section is the Hamilton-Russell Cup, which was offered by the English magnate Frederick Hamilton-Russell as a prize for the 1st Olympiad (London 1927). The cup is kept by the winning team until the next event, when it is consigned to the next winner. 

There is a separate women's competition. Since 1976 it has been held at the same time and venue as the open event, with the two competitions comprising the Chess Olympiad. The trophy for the winning women's team is known as the Vera Menchik Cup in honor of the first Women's World Chess Champion.

Results

† FIDE organized the online olympiads in 2020 and 2021 following the onset of the COVID-19 pandemic.

‡ Russia and India were subsequently declared joint winners after several Indian team members experienced connectivity issues due to a global outage of Cloudflare servers in 2020 Online Chess Olympiad.

§ The 2022 event was originally planned to be held in Minsk, Belarus, but it was rescheduled to Moscow, which originally was host of the 2020 Olympiad, which was canceled due to the COVID-19 pandemic. However, due to the Russian invasion of Ukraine, FIDE made a statement in February 2022 that the tournament will not take place in Russia and will be shifted to Chennai, India.

Gaprindashvili Trophy

The trophy, named after the former women's World Champion Nona Gaprindashvili (1961–1978) and it was created by FIDE in 1997. The  Trophy is awarded to the nation that has the highest total number of match points in the open and women's divisions combined.

Total team ranking

The table contains the Open teams ranked by the medals won at the Chess Olympiad (not including the online or unofficial events), ranked by the number of first-place medals, ties broken by second-place medals, etc.

Most successful players
Boldface denotes active chess players and highest medal count among all players (including these who not included in these tables) per type.

Multiple team champions

Multiple team medalists
The table shows players who have won at least 7 team medals in total at the Chess Olympiads.

Best individual results in the open section
The best individual results in order of overall percentage are:

Notes
 Only players participating in at least four Olympiads are included in this table.
 Medals indicated in the order gold - silver - bronze. The statistics of individual medals includes only medals which are awarding to the top three individual players on each board. The medals for overall performance rating (awarded in 1984–2006) are not included into this statistics, but are listed separately below the table.
 Anatoly Karpov won another individual silver medal for overall performance rating. In total he won 3 gold and 1 silver individual medals.
 Garry Kasparov played his first four Olympiads for the Soviet Union, the rest for Russia. He won another four individual gold medals and one individual silver medal for overall performance rating. In total he won 7 gold, 2 silver and 2 bronze individual medals.
 Paul Keres played his first three Olympiads for Estonia, the rest for the Soviet Union.

See also

Women's Chess Olympiad
World Team Chess Championship
European Team Chess Championship
World Chess Championship
Women's World Chess Championship
Russia (USSR) vs Rest of the World
European Chess Club Cup
World Mind Sports Games
Mind Sports Organisation
Correspondence Chess Olympiad

References

External links
 FIDE Handbook: Chess Olympiads
 OlimpBase: Chess Olympiads
 Student Chess Olympiad - World Student Team Chess Championship

 
Recurring sporting events established in 1924
Biennial sporting events
Chess competitions